Paramesia is a genus of moths belonging to the family Tortricidae.

Species
Paramesia alhamana (Schmidt, 1933)
Paramesia gnomana (Clerck, 1759)
Paramesia paracinctana (Chambon & Khous, 1993)
Paramesia pygmaeana (Amsel, 1956)

See also
List of Tortricidae genera

References

External links
tortricidae.com

Archipini
Tortricidae genera